Halime Zülal Zeren (born April 15, 1995) is a Turkish female swimmer competing in freestyle and backstroke events. Zeren holds national records in various disciplines and age categories. She swimms for Fenerbahçe Swimming. 

Currently, Zeren is a student at Ohio State University, having previously swam at Işık High School in Istanbul.

At the 2013 Mediterranean Games in Mersin, Turkey, Zeren won two bronze medals and set three national records.

She was very successful at the 2013 Islamic Solidarity Games held in Palembang, Indonesia by taking a total of six medals, five of them in gold.

Achievements

See also
 Turkish women in sports

References

1995 births
Place of birth missing (living people)
Turkish female swimmers
Turkish female freestyle swimmers
Turkish female backstroke swimmers
Fenerbahçe swimmers
Living people
Mediterranean Games bronze medalists for Turkey
Swimmers at the 2013 Mediterranean Games
Mediterranean Games medalists in swimming
Islamic Solidarity Games competitors for Turkey
21st-century Turkish women